Citizens Bank PLC is one of the fifth generation banks, scheduled 61st Private Commercial Bank in Bangladesh. Towfika Aftab is the chairman of the bank.

History 
Bangladesh Bank accorded final approval to Citizens Bank PLC as a Commercial Scheduled Bank in the private sector on 15 December, 2020. Earlier, the bank had applied for an extension at several board meetings of Bangladesh Bank as it could not meet other required conditions including paid-up capital of BDT. 500 crore. The chairperson of the bank, Towfika Aftab, she is married to AKM Aftab ul Islam who is a director of Bangladesh Bank. Citizens Bank has been given final approval at the 410th Board Meeting of Bangladesh Bank in 2020 after fulfilling the necessary conditions. After that, a letter was officially sent from the central bank to the Citizens Bank authorities to start banking activities in the country. In November, Md Sayedul Hasan, managing director of the bank, died.

Mohammad Masoom was appointed managing director of the bank in January 2021.

The bank held its first annual general meeting in June at its headquarter. It signed a memorandum of understanding with the Asgar Ali Hospital. In September 2022, Bangladesh Bank approved Citizens Bank to operate as a primary dealer.

See also

 List of Banks in Bangladesh
 Bangladesh Bank

References

Banks of Bangladesh
2020 establishments in Bangladesh